Hannah Herzsprung (born 7 September 1981) is a German actress.

Biography 
Hannah Herzsprung is the daughter of actor Bernd Herzsprung and fashion designer Barbara Engel. She debuted as an actress in 1997 in the BR series Aus heiterem Himmel, where she played the role of Miriam "Mimi" Pauly at the beginning of the fourth and last season. She has been taking private acting lessons since 1999. She took over the Tele 5-Clip-Show musicbox with her sister Sara at the end of 2002. She also started studying Communication Sciences in Vienna. She has had many television roles, including Jule in Das böse Mädchen and since 2003 Vera in the series 18 – Allein unter Mädchen. In 2003 she also had a part in Unter Verdacht: Beste Freunde and a smaller role in the comedy Tramitz & Friends.

Her roles became more ambitious with the television film Emilia – Die zweite Chance, where she played a patient with borderline personality disorder. In 2005, she received her first leading role as the murderer Jenny in Four Minutes by Chris Kraus. On 19 January 2007, she received the Bayerischen Filmpreis for best new female talent. She ended her studies in Vienna and moved to Berlin in order to act in these two films. For Life Actually she was awarded the 2007 Deutschen Filmpreis for best supporting role and the Adolf-Grimme-Preis in 2009.

In 2007, Herzsprung played terrorist Susanne Albrecht in The Baader Meinhof Complex as well as the leading role of Daniela in the film 10 Seconds. In 2008 she played the role of Julia in Stephen Daldry's film The Reader. She also played the role of Charlotte in Uwe Janson's adaptation of Goethe's novel The Sorrows of Young Werther, as well as in Jo Baier's television movie  as young Liesl Karlstadt.

Filmography

References

External links

 
 http://www.tcm.com/tcmdb/title/775221/Lila-Lila/

1981 births
Living people
German film actresses
Actresses from Hamburg
German television actresses
21st-century German actresses
20th-century German actresses